The 1986–87 Liga Leumit season saw Beitar Jerusalem win their first title. Maccabi Yavne, Maccabi Jaffa and Beitar Netanya (in their first, and to date only season in the top division) were all relegated to Liga Artzit. Eli Yani of Hapoel Kfar Saba was the league's top scorer with 16 goals.

Format changes
On 1 September 1986 the IFA board confirmed a proposal through which the number of teams in Liga Leumit would decrease to 14 teams. For this season three teams would relegate to Liga Artzit (as it was in previous seasons), and only one team would be promoted to Liga Leumit.

Final table

Results

References
Israel - List of Final Tables RSSSF

Liga Leumit seasons
Israel
1